Burrville is a neighborhood located in Northeast Washington, D.C., east of the Anacostia River. It is triangular in area, bounded by Nannie Helen Burroughs Avenue to the south, Division Avenue to the northwest, and Eastern Avenue to the northeast.

Neighborhoods in Northeast (Washington, D.C.)